The 2016 Labour Party leadership election was called to elect the new Leader of the Labour Party after incumbent Diederik Samsom announced a leadership election to select the lijsttrekker (top candidate) for the general election of 2017. Lodewijk Asscher beat Samsom by 54.5% to 45.5%.

Procedure
The final list of candidates was published on 7 November; voting started on 28 November and closed on 8 December. A day after, the results were announced. Each of the party's ca. 45,000 members were given a vote in the leadership election. Additionally, any Dutch citizen was able to purchase a temporary membership for 2 euros and gain access to the election within days of their registration.

References

Labour Party (Netherlands)
2016 elections in the Netherlands
Political party leadership elections in the Netherlands
Labour Party (Netherlands) leadership election